Trans World Airlines Flight 514, registration N54328, was a Boeing 727-231 en route from Indianapolis, Indiana and Columbus, Ohio to Washington Dulles International that crashed into Mount Weather, Virginia, on Sunday,  1974. All 92 aboard,  and seven crew members, were killed.

Accident

The flight was being vectored for a non-precision instrument approach to runway 12 at Dulles. Air traffic controllers cleared the flight down to  before clearing them for the approach while not on a published segment.

The cockpit voice recorder later indicated there was some confusion in the cockpit over whether they were still under a radar-controlled approach segment which would allow them to descend safely. After reaching  there were some  altitude deviations which the flight crew discussed as encountering heavy downdrafts and reduced visibility in snow.

The wreckage path was oriented along a line 118 degrees magnetic. Calculations indicated that the left wing went down about six degrees as the aircraft passed through the trees and the aircraft was descending at an angle of about one degree. Numerous heavy components of the aircraft were thrown forward of the outcropping, and numerous intense post-impact fires broke out which were later extinguished.

Investigation
The accident investigation board was split in its decision as to whether the flight crew or Air Traffic Control were  The majority absolved the controllers as the plane was not on a published approach segment; the dissenting opinion was that the flight had been radar  Terminology between pilots and controllers differed without either group being aware of the discrepancy.  It was common practice at the time for controllers to release a flight to its own navigation with "Cleared for the approach," and flight crews commonly believed that was also authorization to descend to the altitude at which the final segment of the approach began.  No clear indication had been given by controllers to Flight 514 that they were no longer on a radar vector segment and therefore responsible for their own navigation. Procedures were clarified after this accident. Controllers now state, "Maintain (specified altitude) until established on a portion of the approach," and pilots now understand that previously assigned altitudes prevail until an altitude change is authorized on the published approach segment the aircraft is currently flying. Ground proximity detection equipment was also mandated for the airlines.

During the NTSB investigation, it was discovered that a United Airlines flight had very narrowly escaped the same fate during the same approach and at the same location only six weeks prior.  This discovery set in motion activities that led to the development of the Aviation Safety Reporting System (ASRS) by the FAA and NASA in 1976 to collect voluntary, confidential reports of possible safety hazards from aviation professionals.

The flight is also of note in that the accident drew undesired attention to the Mount Weather facility, which was the linchpin of plans implemented by the federal government to ensure continuity in the event of a nuclear war. The crash did not damage the facility, since most of its features were underground.  Only its underground main phone line was severed, with service to the complex being restored by C&P Telephone within 2½ hours after the crash.

Aftermath
The crash, its aftermath, and its repercussions are the subject of the 1977 book Sound of Impact: The Legacy of TWA Flight 514 by Adam Shaw. TWA Flight 514 is also mentioned in the closing of the second chapter of Mark Oliver Everett's book Things the Grandchildren Should Know and in F. Lee Bailey's book Cleared for Approach: In Defense of Flying. In 2015, a documentary entitled Diverted: TWA 514 was released.

This was one of two Boeing 727s to crash in the U.S. that day; the other was Northwest Airlines Flight 6231 in New York state, on its way to pick up the Baltimore Colts football team in Buffalo.

Roscoe Cartwright, one of the U.S. Army's first black generals, was killed in the crash.

Crash site then and now

References

External links
 Sound of Impact: The Legacy of TWA Flight 514, Adam Shaw (Viking Press, 1977)
 
 NTSB report
 Civil Defense Doomsday Hideaway, Ted Gup. TIME Magazine, August 10, 1992, pp. 32–39.
 Documentary produced in 2015 by WJLA-TV/Washington

Accidents and incidents involving the Boeing 727
Airliner accidents and incidents in Virginia
Airliner accidents and incidents involving controlled flight into terrain
Airliner accidents and incidents caused by pilot error
Aviation accidents and incidents caused by air traffic controller error
Clarke County, Virginia
514
Aviation accidents and incidents in the United States in 1974
1974 in Virginia
December 1974 events in the United States
Dulles International Airport